Samuel Devons FRS (30 September 1914 – 6 December 2006) was a British physicist and science historian.

Biography
Devons, son of a Lithuanian immigrant, David Isaac Devons 1881-1926 and Edith Edelston from York 1891-1938 
Sam was born in Bangor, Wales. When he turned 16, he was awarded a scholarship for physics at Trinity College, Cambridge. In 1935, Devons received his bachelor's degree at Trinity College, and his PhD in 1939.

Personal life
Devons married Ruth Toubkin in 1938 in England, United Kingdom, and moved to the United States in 1960, to work at the Columbia University Physics Department. He had four daughters (Susan, Judith, Amanda and Cathryn), and had 12 grandchildren (Laura, Marc, Benjamin, Daniel, Jesse, David, Jonathan, Anna, Jacob, Rachel, Jessica and Matthew), and 9 great-grandchildren at the time of his death  (Joel, Julia, Emily, Nathan, Elisheva, Isabella, Stella, Noah and Sophia, and later  Hannah, Kathryn, Constantino, Gabriel, Sebastian and Lucas).

In World War II, Devons served as a senior scientific officer in the Air Ministry, Ministry of Aircraft Production and Ministry of Supply, working on antiaircraft barrages, microwaves, and radar. During the war, he became a liaison officer for the US and UK, posted at the Massachusetts Institute of Technology radiation laboratory. At the end of the war, he served as a British intelligence officer in Germany, assisting in the interrogation of surrendered scientists.

In 2005, he was honored for 50 years as a Fellow of the Royal Society.

Institutional history
 Lecturer in Physics, University of Cambridge, 1946–49, 
 Professor of Physics, Imperial College London, 1950–55 
 Langworthy Professor of Physics and Director of Physical Laboratories, University of Manchester, 1955–60.
 Professor of Physics at Columbia University, New York, 1960–85, Department Chair, 1963–67 and Professor Emeritus until he died of congestive heart failure in 2006.

Works
 The Excited States of Nuclei (1949)
 Biology and Physical Sciences (1969) (ed.)
 High Energy Physics and Nuclear Structure (1970) (ed.)

References

External links
Finding aid to the Samuel Devons Papers at Columbia University. Rare Book & Manuscript Library
http://www.columbia.edu/cu/news/06/12/devon061212.html
 https://web.archive.org/web/20070211003923/http://news.independent.co.uk/people/obituaries/article2121638.ece Obituary

1914 births
2006 deaths
Fellows of the Royal Society
British physicists
Jewish scientists
Alumni of Trinity College, Cambridge
Academics of Imperial College London
Academics of the Victoria University of Manchester
People from Bangor, Gwynedd
Welsh Jews
Welsh people of Lithuanian descent
Fellows of the American Physical Society